Hanako Games is an independent video game development company founded by Georgina Bensley that develops PC games mostly involving female protagonists centered on fantasy- and anime-inspired style. Games on the site include Fatal Hearts, Cute Knight, Summer Session, and Science Girls. The website provides free demos for all of the games along with downloadable wallpapers. Hanako Games is an affiliate of Winter Wolves, Tycoon Games and sakevisual.

In 2015, Hanako Games started to publish visual novel games that were not originally written by them, and release them under the name Hanabira. The first game Sword Daughter was released on January 5, 2015. Originally, the story was a gamebook of the Dragontales series by Rhondi A. Vilott Salsitz and was first published in the 1980s. In 2016, the game A Littly Lily Princess was released under the label of Hanabira. It is visual novel game with raising sim elements and based on the novel A Little Princess by Frances Hodgson Burnett.

History
Founder Georgina Bensley released a text adventure game in 2000 under the name Papillon. In 2005, Bensley released Cute Knight. While not Hanako Games's first release, it was their first to be redistributed by other companies.

Awards
In 2007, Hanako Games was awarded the top prize at Innovate 2007, sponsored by the Casual Games Association.

Black Closet was named as a finalist for the Excellence in Narrative category for the 2016 Independent Games Festival.

Developed games
as Hanako Games

as Hanabira

References

External links

Interview with Hanako Games
Another Interview
Interview with Erin Bell

Video game companies of the United Kingdom
Video game companies established in 2003